State Route 127 (SR 127) is a  state highway that runs west-to-east through portions of Marion, Taylor, Macon, and Houston counties in the west-central and central parts of the U.S. state of Georgia. It connects the north-central part of Marion County with the Perry–Warner Robins area.

Route description
SR 127 begins at an intersection with SR 41, about halfway between Buena Vista and Juniper, in Marion County. It heads east to an intersection with SR 240 (Ronnie Road). About  later is the northern terminus of SR 240 Connector. It heads north into Taylor County, and meets SR 90 in Mauk. The two routes head concurrent to the southeast. In Charing. There, SR 137 joins the concurrency for a short while. SR 90/SR 127 continue to the east-southeast until they meet U.S. Route 19 (US 19) and SR 3, southwest of Rupert. From this point, the four routes travel concurrently into the town. In the southern part of the town, SR 127 splits off to the east-northeast and has another intersection with SR 90 before leaving Rupert.

The highway crosses into Macon County. In the county is a brief concurrency with SR 128. Then, it meets SR 49 and runs concurrent with it to Marshallville. A few miles to the east, it briefly runs along the Macon–Houston county line. It enters Houston County proper for a very short stretch, runs along the Houston–Peach county line very briefly, and re-enters Houston County proper. Southwest of Perry, SR 127 meets and runs concurrent with SR 224 into the city. In Perry, it intersects US 41/SR 7, which join the concurrency. Almost immediately, they meet an interchange with Interstate 75 (I-75). A short distance later, SR 224 splits off to the southeast, while US 41/SR 7/SR 127 head northeast into the main part of the city on Courtney Hodges Boulevard and Commerce Street. At Ball Street is SR 341/SR 11 Business. At this intersection, SR 7 turns onto US 341 north, while SR 11 Business joins the concurrency. The road continues along Commerce Street and turns north onto Macon Road. At Swift Street, SR 127 departs to the east, while US 41/SR 11 Business continues to the north-northeast SR 127 continues to the northeast, through urban areas of the county, until it meets its eastern terminus, an intersection with US 129/SR 247 in Kathleen.

There are only two parts of SR 127 that are part of the National Highway System, a system of roadways important to the nation's economy, defense, and mobility. They are the following:
 In Perry
 From the intersection of US 41/SR 7/SR 127 and SR 224 in the southwestern part of the city to the intersection of US 41/SR 11 Business and SR 127 in the central part of the city
 Perry–Warner Robins
 From the intersection with Perry Parkway in the northeastern part of Perry to the intersection with South Houston Lake Road in the south-central part of Warner Robins

Major intersections

See also

References

External links

 
 Georgia Roads (Routes 121 - 140)

127
Transportation in Marion County, Georgia
Transportation in Taylor County, Georgia
Transportation in Macon County, Georgia
Transportation in Houston County, Georgia